Orlando L. Martin (April 28, 1872 – May 2, 1951) was a Vermont farmer, teacher and politician who served as Speaker of the Vermont House of Representatives.

Biography
Orlando Lewis Martin was born in Plainfield, Vermont on April 28, 1872. He graduated from Goddard Seminary and became a teacher and principal in Plainfield. He was superintendent of schools for several years as well as town meeting moderator, auditor and lister.

A Republican, Martin was a longtime member of the Vermont State Fair Commission.  From 1908 to 1909 he served in the Vermont House of Representatives.

After his House term Martin served as Vermont's Commissioner of Agriculture.

From 1915 to 1917 Martin served in the Vermont Senate.

In 1923 Martin returned to the Vermont House and was elected Speaker, serving until 1925. On April 9, 1923, Martin was with the Vermont Secretary of State, Harry A. Black when Black was killed at the train station in Wells River. Black had been ill in the month before his train trip to Montpelier, and according to Martin and other witnesses, Black appeared to faint as he was walking across several tracks to change trains.  He fell on one track, and was struck by a moving train.  Martin was among those who observed the accident and were unable to render aid to Black before he was killed; Martin was not injured himself.

In 1938 Martin was elected Washington County Assistant Judge, and he served from 1939 until his death.

Martin also served as Master of the National Grange and President of the National Grange Fire Insurance Company of Keene, New Hampshire.

In 1895, he married Alice Glee Kent of Calais, Vermont. They had one daughter, Fanny.

Martin was a Universalist.

Judge Martin died in Montpelier, Vermont on May 2, 1951. He was buried at Plainmont Cemetery in North Montpelier.

References 

1872 births
1951 deaths
People from Plainfield, Vermont
Speakers of the Vermont House of Representatives
Republican Party members of the Vermont House of Representatives
Vermont state court judges
Burials in Vermont
Goddard College alumni